Wang Yongnian (17 March 1927 – 21 July 2012) was a Chinese translator. He was the first person who translated Giovanni Boccaccio's The Decameron in whole texts into Chinese. He was among the first few in China who translated the works of Jorge Luis Borges's into Chinese language. His translations are well respected by domestic and over scholars.

Wang was a member of the China Democratic League.

Biography
Wang was born in Dinghai District, Zhoushan, Zhejiang, on March 17, 1927. His father was the director of the Yunnan Salt Bureau during the Republic of China (1912-1949). He graduated from St. John's University, Shanghai, where he studied alongside Eileen Chang. During the Second Sino-Japanese War, he studied Japanese and Russian. After the establishment of the Communist State, he worked at Translation Publishing House in Shanghai. In late 1950s, the Xinhua News Agency wanted to set up a Spanish Foreign Reporting Group, they looked for talents in Shanghai and through the Shanghai Municipal Committee of the Communist Party of China knew that Wang Yongnian of the Translation Publishing House understands Spanish, than he was transferred to Beijing. In the 1980s, he worked as a reporter for Xinhua News Agency in Mexico. He retired in the 1990s. He died of bowel infarction at Xuanwu Hospital in Beijing, on July 21, 2012.

Personal life
Wang had one son and two daughters. His eldest daughter named Wang Jiang.

Translations
 The Decameron
 Selection of O. Henry's Short Stories
 Alice's Adventures in Wonderland
 The Garden of Forking Paths
 The Book of Sand
 The Aleph
 Ficciones
 The Moon in front of Saint Martin's Notes
 El informe de Brodie
 A Universal History of Infamy
 Song of Shadow for Six Strings
 Tales of the Night
 Discussion Set
 The Other
 Dante Alighieri

References

1927 births
2012 deaths
People from Zhoushan
St. John's University, Shanghai alumni
Italian–Chinese translators
Spanish–Chinese translators
English–Chinese translators
20th-century Chinese translators
21st-century Chinese translators